AQD or variant may refer to:

 Additional qualification designator, code used in the United States Navy
 Ampari Dogon (ISO 639-3 language code 'aqd'), language spoken in Mali